This is one of Robert Frost's smaller collections. This poetic collection was published in New York Times on June 1, 1947. It is dedicated to Robert Frost's six grandchildren. There is tenderness and passive sadness in this volume. In this collection, with Spiritual Themes, Robert Frost  portrays religion in an ambiguous way. 

The poems of this collection:
 Directive 
 A Young Birch
 Skeptic
 Etherealizing
 Why Wait for Science
 Too Anxious for Reverse
 One Step Backward Taken

American poetry collections